The 2021 New Zealand bravery awards were announced via a Special Honours List on 16 December 2021. The awards recognised the bravery of 10 people in connection with the Christchurch mosque shootings on 15 March 2019.

New Zealand Cross (NZC)

The New Zealand Cross was awarded for acts of great bravery in a situation of extreme danger:
 Dr Naeem Rashid – of Christchurch.
 Abdul Aziz Wahabzadah

New Zealand Bravery Decoration (NZBD)
The New Zealand Bravery Decoration was awarded for an act of exceptional bravery in a situation of danger:
 Liam Christiaan Armand Beale
 Senior Constable Scott Eric Carmody
 Senior Constable James Andrew Manning
 Ziyaad Shah

New Zealand Bravery Medal (NZBM)
The New Zealand Bravery Medal was awarded for an act of bravery:
 Lance Henry Bradford
 Wayne Maley
 Mark Garry Miller
 Michael James Robinson

References

New Zealand Royal Honours System
Bravery awards
Hon
New Zealand bravery awards